Malax is a municipality of Finland.

It is located in the province of Western Finland and is part of the Ostrobothnia region.

The municipality is bilingual, with the majority being Swedish and the minority Finnish speakers.

Politics
Results of the 2011 Finnish parliamentary election in Malax:

Swedish People's Party   82.7%
Social Democratic Party   7.8%
Christian Democrats   2.9%
Finns Party   2.5%
Centre Party   1.5%
National Coalition Party   0.9%
Left Alliance   0.8%
Green League   0.3%

References

External links

Municipality of Malax – Official website 

Municipalities of Ostrobothnia (region)
Populated coastal places in Finland
Populated places established in 1607